Chrysocoma is a genus of flowering plants in the family Asteraceae, native to Africa and Australia.

 Species

References

Astereae
Asteraceae genera
Taxa named by Carl Linnaeus